Jennifer Golbeck is a computer scientist. She currently is a professor at the College of Information Studies, an affiliate professor in the Computer Science Department, and an affiliate professor in the Journalism Department, all at the University of Maryland, College Park. Golbeck was director of the University of Maryland Human–Computer Interaction Lab from 2011 to 2014.

Education
Jennifer Golbeck completed her Doctor of Philosophy in computer science from the University of Maryland, College Park. She also earned an SM and SB in Computer Science and an AB in Economics from the University of Chicago.

Research
Jennifer Golbeck is known for her work on computational social network analysis. She developed methods for inferring information about relationships and people in social networks. Her models for computing trust between people in social networks are among the first in the field. Social trust was for used in early research on trust-based recommender systems. She was a program co-chair of ACM RecSys 2015.

Golbeck has received attention for her work on computing personality traits and political preferences of individuals based on their social network profiles. Her presentation at TEDxMidatlantic, discussing the need for new methods of educating users about how to protect their personal data, was selected as one of TED's 2014 Year in Ideas talks. She presented at TEDxGeorgetown, about pets on the internet.

Media and publications

Golbeck is a contributor to Slate and a guest host on the Kojo Nnamdi Show, a talk show on Washington, DC's NPR affiliate, WAMU.

Books
 Online Harassment (ed.) Springer (2018) 
 Social Media Investigation Singress (2015) 
 Analyzing the Social Web Morgan Kaufmann (2013) 
 Computing with Social Trust (ed.) Springer (2008) 
 Trust on the World Wide Web: A Survey Now Publishers (2008) 
 Art Theory for Web Design Addison-Wesley (2005)

Personal life 
Golbeck splits her time between Silver Spring, Maryland and the Florida Keys.

Social media 
Golbeck is also a prominent social media figure on Twitter, Instagram, and Snapchat. Her account, The Golden Ratio, which features images and videos of her golden retrievers, has over 152,000 followers. Golbeck's current dogs are Venkman, Hopper, Guacamole, Chief Brody, Remoulade, and Cheddar. Other members of “the squad” who were owned by Golbeck and featured prominently on The Golden Ratio accounts who have since passed away include: Maggie, Jasmine, Riley, Queso, Swizzle, Saint Patrick, Parmesan, Voodoo, and Manchego. Also featured on the account are dogs Golbeck fosters along with her adopted dogs. Golbeck also manages various other social media accounts, such as jen runs with dogs, which highlights her experiences as an ultramarathon runner. Podcasts produced by Golbeck include The Golden Ratio Podcast, Murders in Paradise, and Runs With Dogs.

References

American women computer scientists
US
Illinois
People from Crystal Lake, Illinois
University of Maryland, College Park faculty
1976 births
Living people
University of Chicago alumni
Human–computer interaction researchers
Engineers from Illinois
21st-century American women